is a Japanese manga series written and illustrated by Masato Fujisaki. It was first serialized in Shogakukan's seinen manga magazine Weekly Big Comic Spirits in 2008, and later in Monthly Big Comic Spirits from 2010 to 2011. Its chapters were collected in two tankōbon volumes. A ten-episode television drama was broadcast on Nippon Television in 2011.

Synopsis
Misaki Tennoji, the number one cabaret girl at Roppongi's "Club Southern Sea", becomes a teacher at Midō Gakuen High School, at the strong recommendation of Principal Tamatsukuri. On her first day, the principal assigns her to be in charge of Class 2Z, a special class for students who are not attending school due to various problems. The students were gathered as a compromise between the principal's faction, which wanted to graduate any student without abandoning them, and the vice principal's faction, which believed that expulsion was unavoidable for students with problems. When Misaki learns of this situation at the welcoming party for the new class, she is inspired to help the students recover from their problems by drawing on her own childhood memories and her experience as a cabaret club hostess.

Media

Manga
Following a two-year hiatus, the manga was later serialized in Monthly Big Comic Spirits from October 27, 2010, to January 27, 2011. Shogakukan collected its chapters in two tankōbon volumes, released on September 30, 2008, and February 26, 2011.

Volume list

Drama
A ten-episode television drama adaptation was broadcast on Nippon Television from January 12 to March 16, 2011.

See also
Wild Life, another manga series by the same author

References

External links
 

Nippon TV dramas
Seinen manga
Shogakukan manga